Palma District is a district of Cabo Delgado Province in northern Mozambique. It covers 3,576 km² with 52,269 inhabitants (2015). Its principal town is Palma. The district borders Mtwara Region, Tanzania to the north.

External links
Government profile 

Districts in Cabo Delgado Province